Westcombe  may refer to:

Westcombe, Batcombe, Somerset, England
Westcombe, Somerton, Somerset, England
Westcombe Park, London
Westcombe baronets, a title in the Baronetage of England